Valbella  is an Italian restaurant in the Riverside section of Greenwich, Connecticut with sister locations in Midtown Manhattan and the Meatpacking District, Manhattan.  Regulars included Joe Torre, "almost the entire Yankees team" and Regis Philbin. Philbin was a Saturday night regular for 22 years and when he passed away, they left his regular table empty in his honor.

Wine Spectator awarded them with a Best of Award of Excellence. 

On December 20, 2009, there was a fire that caused them to close for a month for repairs.

Mafia
In 1998, the restaurant was invaded by members of the Gambino crime family to get them to pay protection money ($5,000/month) and free food.  Underboss  Anthony "The Genius" Megale, acting boss Arnold Squitieri and 30 others were brought up on federal charges of extortion in 2005.

Megale, considered Connecticut’s highest ranking Mob member, was sentenced to eleven years for this and other crimes.  

Joaquín "Jack" García, a retired FBI agent, mentioned Valbella in his book Making Jack Falcone: Am Undercover FBI Agent Takes Down a Mafia Family., 

García had Caporegime Greg DePalma on tape saying he dined at Valbella for free and controlled the restaurant.

References

Italian restaurants in the United States
Restaurants in Connecticut
Buildings and structures in Greenwich, Connecticut
Italian-American organized crime